A conlanger  is a person who invents constructed languages (aka conlangs).

Professional conlangers
Individuals who have been hired to create languages.
 Victoria Fromkin - Paku (a.k.a. Pakuni)
 Paul Frommer - Na'vi, Barsoomian
 Madhan Karky - Kiliki
 Marc Okrand - Klingon, Vulcan, Atlantean
 
 Matt Pearson - Thhtmaa
 David J. Peterson - Dothraki, Valyrian, Kastithanu (Castithan), L'Irathi (Irathient), Indojisnen, Sondiv, Shiväisith, Lishepus, Trigedasleng, Noalath, Inha, Munja'kin
 Wolf Wikeley - Tho Fan

Published international-auxiliary conlangers
Conlangers who have created languages intended for international communication.
 Louis de Beaufront
 Léon Bollack
 James Cooke Brown
 Louis Couturat: Ido language
 George Boeree
 Alexander Gode
 Ján Herkeľ
 Lancelot Hogben
 Alex G. Igbineweka
 Otto Jespersen
 Francis Lodwick: Common Writing
 Juraj Križanić
 Matija Majar
 Vojtěch Merunka
 Jackson Moore
 Charles Kay Ogden
 Giuseppe Peano: Latino sine flexione
 Kenneth L. Pike
 Waldemar Rosenberger
 Johann Martin Schleyer: Volapük
 Kenneth Searight: Sona
 Jan van Steenbergen
 Edgar de Wahl: Interlingue
 John Wilkins: unnamed universal language
 L. L. Zamenhof: Esperanto

Published fictional conlangers
Conlangers whose work has been published in books or other media that they created:
 Richard Adams: Lapine, in Watership Down
 M.A.R. Barker: Tsolyáni for Tékumel
 Hector Berlioz
 Marion Zimmer Bradley
 Anthony Burgess: Nadsat in A Clockwork Orange and a prehistoric language in Quest for Fire.
 Samuel R. Delany
 Suzette Doctolero: Enchanta from the Encantadia Saga.
 Diane Duane
 Suzette Haden Elgin: Láadan, in the Native Tongue series
 Václav Havel
 Frank Herbert
 Hergé
 Robert Jordan: The Old Tongue in The Wheel of Time
 Ursula K. Le Guin
 Barry B. Longyear
 George Orwell: Newspeak, in Nineteen Eighty-Four
 Christopher Paolini: The Ancient Language in the Inheritance Cycle (Eragon and its sequels)
 Lynne Sharon Schwartz: in The Writing on the Wall
 J. R. R. Tolkien: more than twenty languages including Quenya, Sindarin, Khuzdul; see Languages constructed by J. R. R. Tolkien
 Karen Traviss: Mando'a in the Star Wars expanded universe
 Christian Vander
 Tad Williams: Higher Singing in Tailchaser's Song
 Gene Wolfe: Ascian in The Book of the New Sun

Other notable conlangers
Conlangers whose languages are neither international auxiliary languages nor part of popular media, but are nonetheless significant among enthusiasts, have amassed a notable amount of speakers, or do not fit in other categories:
Sonja Lang: Toki Pona, a minimalist language which has gained a large following and several publications over the years since its creation in 2001.

References

Linguists
 
Lists of inventors